Victor Waito Zue (born  1944) is a Chinese American computer scientist and professor at Massachusetts Institute of Technology.

From 1989 to 2001, he headed the Spoken Language Systems Group at the MIT Laboratory for Computer Science. The group pioneered the development of many systems enabling interactions between human and computers using spoken language. Then, he served a ten-year tenure as Director of the Lab for Computer Science (LCS), and the Co-Director and Director of the Computer Science and Artificial Intelligence Lab (CSAIL). Since 2001, Victor has returned to teaching and research from the director position in 2011. He is also a distinguished research chair professor at NTU Taiwan.

Biography
Zue was born in Sichuan, China and raised in Taiwan and Hong Kong.  He came to the US at age 18 to study at the University of Florida. He graduated with his bachelor's degree in electrical engineering in 1968. He received his Sc.D. from the Massachusetts Institute of Technology in 1976. In the early part of his career, Zue studied acoustics, phonetics, and phonological properties of
American English. His research interest shifted to the development of spoken language interfaces to make human-computer interactions easier and more natural. Between 1989 and 2001, he led the Spoken Language Systems Group at the MIT Laboratory for Computer Science. During this time, he helped lead development of the TIMIT Acoustic-Phonetic Continuous Speech Corpus. Zue collaborates with and is married to fellow MIT researcher Stephanie Seneff.

Honours and awards
Zue is a Fellow of the Acoustical Society of America, the American Association for the Advancement of Science, and the International Speech Communication Association. He is an elected member of the U.S. National Academy of Engineering, and an Academician of the Academia Sinica in Taiwan. He received the Okawa Prize in 2012, and the IEEE James L. Flanagan Speech and Audio Processing Award in 2013.

References

External references
Q&A with MIT's Victor Zue

MIT Computer Science and Artificial Intelligence Laboratory people
American computer scientists
1940s births
Living people
Members of the United States National Academy of Engineering
Massachusetts Institute of Technology alumni
University of Florida alumni
Speech processing researchers
Fellows of the Acoustical Society of America
Chinese emigrants to the United States
Scientists from Sichuan
Chinese computer scientists